Salah Al-Mukhtar (born 1944 in Baghdad) is the foremost resisting Ba'athist leader of Iraq. He was Deputy General secretary of the Arab League and Saddam Hussein's ambassador to many countries.

He served in the Iran-Iraq war within the Iraqi Army attaining the rank of Colonel.

He left Iraq for Yemen due to the war in 2003, he then went to Germany during the Arab Spring in 2011. Since 3 November 2020 he has been head of the Ba'ath party in Iraq.

References

External links
Iraqi Opposition Leader Speaks
Salah Al-Mukhtar Interview
Salah al-Mukhtar:The Iraqi Resistance is geared to keep on fighting for a decade to come

1944 births
Living people
People from Baghdad
Ambassadors of Iraq to India
Arab Socialist Ba'ath Party – Iraq Region politicians